This was the first edition of the tournament. Anastasia Potapova and Vera Zvonareva won the title, defeating Alexandra Panova and Galina Voskoboeva in the final, 6–0, 6–3.

Seeds

Draw

Draw

References
Main Draw

Moscow River Cup - Doubles
 Moscow River Cup